The Salma Mountains is a mountain range in Ha'il Province, Saudi Arabia. Like the Ajā, this range is part of the Shammar range.

See also
 Adayra Valley
 Ha'il
 List of mountains in Saudi Arabia
 People:
 Al Fadl
 Jarrahids
 Tayy'

References

External links
 Map showing the study area of Salma Mountains
 Mid of Salma Mountains

Mountain ranges of Saudi Arabia